Landguard Common is a  biological Site of Special Scientific Interest in Felixstowe in Suffolk. An area of 16.3 hectares at the southern end is also a Local Nature Reserve.

This spit on the northern outskirts of Felixstowe has a vegetated shingle beach, which is a fragile and rare habitat. Flora include sea kale, yellow horned poppy, sea sandwort, sea campion and sea pea. Areas of saltmarsh provide cover for small birds.

There is access to the site from View Point Road.

References

Felixstowe
Local Nature Reserves in Suffolk
Sites of Special Scientific Interest in Suffolk
Sites of Special Scientific Interest notified in 1984